Pentzia tomentosa is a species of flowering plant in the aster family. It is endemic to Namibia. Its natural habitat is rocky areas.

References

 

Pentzia
Flora of Namibia
Least concern plants
Taxonomy articles created by Polbot